Mismatch (stylized as Mis(s)match) is a 2019 Telugu-language romantic sports film directed by N. V. Nirmal Kumar. The film stars Uday Shankar and Aishwarya Rajesh in the lead roles.

Cast 

Uday Shankar as Siddharth. 
Master Adhiroh as younger Siddharth
The sequence where he repeats thousands of numbers from memory is based on Shankar's real life.
Aishwarya Rajesh as Mahalakshmi
Pradeep Rawat as Mahalakshmi's father
Sanjay Swaroop as Siddharth's father
Naga Mahesh as a villager
Ravulapati Venkata Ramarao
Malakpet Shailaja as a villager
Bhadram as Bhadram
Roopa Laxmi as Mahalakshmi's mother
Sandhya Janak 
Sharanya Pradeep as Mahalakshmi's friend
Padma Jayanthi as Mahalakshmi's aunt
Laxman
Munna

Production 
Uday Shanker, who was last seen in the film Aatagadharaa Siva, wanted to do a film with a message. N. V. Nirmal Kumar, who had previously directed Salim, was chosen to direct the film.

Soundtrack 

The songs were composed by Gifton Elias. The first single, "Arere Arere", was launched by Trivikram Srinivas on 25 November 2019. The song "Ee Manase" from Tholi Prema was remixed and used in the film.

Release 
The film released on 6 December.

Critical reception 
This film received positive reviews from fans and polarized reviews from critics.
The Hans India gave 3.5 of 5 stars and stated that "On the whole, 'Mismatch' is a decent entertainer".
The Times of India gave 2 of 5 stars and praised the performances of Rajesh and Rawat, but stated how "there’s only so much they can do to save the film from a routine script and terrible narration".

References 

2019 films
2010s Telugu-language films
Indian sports drama films
Films shot in Andhra Pradesh
2019 romantic drama films
Indian romantic drama films
2010s sports drama films